One, Two, Many is a 2008 American sex comedy film distributed by National Lampoon, directed by Michael DeLorenzo and written by and starring "Stuttering" John Melendez.

Synopsis 
A alcoholic man juggles multiple women in his romantic life in hopes of fulfilling his dream of having a threesome and ends up paying the price.

Reception
One, Two, Many received mostly negative reviews from critics. In a review for DVD Talk, critic Brian Orndorf gave the film a D− stating, "The short answer is that Many is atrociously unfunny and Melendez reveals himself to be a man of zero charisma and artistic capability." DVD Verdict critic David Johnson said, "I have nothing positive to say about this release. I'm sure it will find a few fans, but One, Two, Many isn't sexy or funny or anything else."  IGN's review by James Musgrove states "First and foremost, let it be known that John Melendez is a horrible actor. His thick New York accent combined with his whiny style of acting make for one of the most unlikable protagonists in recent memory... Melendez's style of contorting his face into bizarre expressions makes one almost cringe every time he speaks a line."

References

External links 

2008 films
American sex comedy films
National Lampoon films
2000s sex comedy films
Films about threesomes
2008 directorial debut films
2008 comedy films
2000s English-language films
2000s American films